The fetal origins hypothesis (differentiated from the developmental origins of health and disease hypothesis, which emphasizes environmental conditions both before and immediately after birth) proposes that the period of gestation has significant impacts on the developmental health and wellbeing outcomes for an individual ranging from infancy to adulthood. The effects of fetal origin are marked by three characteristics: latency, wherein effects may not be apparent until much later in life; persistency, whereby conditions resulting from a fetal effect continue to exist for a given individual; and genetic programming, which describes the 'switching on' of a specific gene due to prenatal environment.  Research in the areas of economics, epidemiology, and epigenetics offer support for the hypothesis.

Background
The fetus was once believed to be a "perfect parasite", immune to harmful environmental toxins passed from the mother via the placenta.  Stemming from this belief, pregnant women of the early to mid 20th century freely drank alcohol, ingested medications, smoked cigarettes, and were largely ignorant of any nutritional needs for a developing fetus.  This easy going attitude about pregnancy was challenged, however, by findings relating substances ingested by a mother to tragic outcomes for a fetus.  The birth defects crisis due to the medication thalidomide in the 1960s, where thousands of children were born with defects ranging from brain damage to truncated and missing arms and legs is an example of how a seemingly miracle medication supposed to prevent morning sickness instead had disastrous consequences.  Similarly, in 1971, a drug known as DES, diethylstilbestrol, when taken by pregnant women, was found to be causing an incredibly rare vaginal cancer known as clear-cell adenocarcinoma in young girls when the cancer was traditionally only found to affect those of post-menopausal age.  This finding, in particular, demonstrates that events occurring during gestation are capable of impacting future health into adulthood.  As perhaps the most well-known fetal risk, It wasn't until 1973 that fetal alcohol syndrome was first formally diagnosed, and not until 1989 that the United States government began requiring warning labels directed at pregnant women to be in place on all alcoholic beverages for sale. While the risks associated with certain substances have been well documented during pregnancy, the fetal origins hypothesis goes beyond medical substances to expand upon the effects of maternal stress, obesity, influenza, nutrition, and pollution on a developing fetus.

Barker's hypothesis
Epidemiologist David Barker was the earliest proponent of the theory of fetal origins of adult disease, prompting the theory to be denoted as "Barker's hypothesis". In 1986, Barker published findings proposing a direct link between prenatal nutrition and late-onset coronary heart disease.  He had noticed that the poorest areas of England were the same areas with the highest rates of heart disease, unearthing the predictive relationship between low birth weight and adult disease.  His findings were met with criticism, mainly because at the time heart disease was considered to be predominantly determined by lifestyle and genetic factors. Since Barker's initial findings, the results have been replicated in diverse populations of Europe, Asia, North American, Africa, and Australia.  In explanation of such findings, Barker suggests that fetuses learn to adapt to the environment they expect to enter into once outside of the womb.  Essentially, all transmissions entering the placenta act as "postcards" giving the fetus clues as to the outside world, preparing its physiology appropriately.  This can be an adaptive mechanism, when fetal conditions accurately represent the world of birth; alternatively, it can be a harmful mechanism, when fetal conditions of plenitude or scarcity do not match the world of birth and the child has been physiologically predisposed to inhabit an environment where expected resources are drastically different from reality.

Thrifty phenotype
The thrifty phenotype hypothesis proposes that a low availability of nutrients during the prenatal stage followed by an improvement in nutritional availability in early childhood causes an increase risk of metabolic disorders, including Type II diabetes, as a result of permanent changes in the metabolic processing of glucose-insulin determined in utero.  This predominantly affects poor communities, where maternal malnutrition may be rampant, in turn causing fetuses to be biologically programmed to expect sparse nutritional environments.  But, once in the world, the readily accessible processed foods consumed are unable to be processed efficiently by individuals who had their metabolic systems pre-set to expect scarcity.  This difference between expected nutritional deficits and actual food surplus results in obesity and eventually Type II Diabetes. Janet Rich-Edwards, an epidemiologist at Harvard Medical School, initially set out to disprove the fetal origins theory with her database of over 100,000 nurses. Instead, she found that the results hold: a strong relationship exists between low birth weight and later coronary heart disease and stroke.

Research findings

Economic support
Pregnancy outcomes can impact the wellbeing of a society.  Comparisons between the children who were in gestation during the 1918 flu pandemic and those in gestation immediately before or after the health crisis show marked differences between the two groups on census data.  Across all socioeconomic measures, those who were fetuses during the crisis attained lower educational achievement, income, and socioeconomic status.  Specifically, individuals affected were 15% less likely to graduate high school, 15% more likely to be poor, and 20% more likely to be disabled as adults.  Even federal welfare payments were higher for the gestational cohort than those born before or after the flu hit. The same economic researcher, Douglas Almond, has investigated other historical situations affecting particular cohorts of fetuses: children born during or immediately following the Chernobyl nuclear disaster explosion, and China's Great Leap Forward (which resulted in a deadly famine).  Both prenatally exposed groups suffered lower cognitive abilities and reduced employment levels.  Such outcomes can have lasting impacts on the productivity and economic security of a society for an entire generation of individuals, and perhaps even continue to affect future descendants through changes in gene expression.

Epidemiological and epigenetic support

Epigenetics refers to the study of the behavior of genes, and how gene expression can be altered by the environment without changes made in DNA.  This is believed to be particularly possible during prenatal development, and both stress and diet have been known to causes changes to a fetus. Findings linking maternal exposure to pollution with poor health outcomes for children are possibly linked to the altering of gene expression.  Additionally, studies focusing on maternal weight show gene altering may be occurring.  Women who are overweight at the time of pregnancy have children that are more likely to be overweight themselves.  This could be due to the genetic heritability of genes related to obesity.  But, siblings born to these same women after they had weight reduction surgery were no more likely to be overweight than the rest of the general population.  The metabolic nature of the children was completely different, despite being born to the same mother, supporting the idea that the gestational environment strongly influences future outcomes. In discussing the epigenetics findings of fetal origins, Princeton University's Janet Currie says, "The long-vaunted distinction between nature and nurture is therefore outdated and unhelpful.  Poor nurture during pregnancy can worsen the hand that nature has dealt."

Epidemiological research, or the study of the health and disease patterns of certain populations, allow for controls not possible in other research avenues.  When a significant situation, disaster, or event occurs across a given population, it can be assumed that the entire population is affected, thus generalizing findings across all demographics in a given group. Certain historical events provide epidemiological support for the developmental origins of health and disease, including the Dutch Hunger Winter and the Holocaust.

1918 flu pandemic
During the 1918 flu pandemic, an estimated 20% of the world’s population became infected and 50 million of those infections proved to be fatal. In the United States, the average lifespan dropped by 12 years per person. The disease struck indiscriminately by class but was often fatal for those that were in their 20s and 30s while having a particularly strong effect on pregnant women, infecting one third of all American women that were pregnant between 1918 and 1919. Children who were born in 1919 and had mothers who were infected during gestation experienced many handicaps later in life. Those born in 1919 experienced a 5% or more wage drop and were often found to have lower educational achievement overall. These children were also 20% more likely to be disabled than other comparable cohorts (early 1918 and late 1919) who did not experience in utero exposure. In a study conducted in 2008 it was found that in utero exposure to the pandemic led to higher chances of developing coronary heart disease and kidney disease later in life. The study concluded an 11.8% increased chance of coronary heart disease for those born in the first quarter of 1919. and a 51% increased chance of developing kidney disease for those born in the fourth quarter in 1918 as compared to those born in early 1918 and late 1919. It is also notable that those who were already born but young (between the ages of 1 and 5) during exposure did not have a noticeable increase in coronary heart disease or kidney disease. In Italy, one of the countries most affected by the pandemic, there was a drop in educational attainment for those in utero during exposure to the pandemic. Being exposed to the pandemic while in utero would lead to an average loss of 0.3–0.4 years of schooling. These effects were much higher or lower depending on the district of Italy. The possibility that maternal exposure to influenza during gestation may be linked to increased rates of schizophrenia later in life for the child. In a recent study conducted in California they were able to predict schizophrenia in adult offspring by analyzing the influenza antibodies of pregnant women in 1959–1966. It has been hypothesized that a definite link exists between influenza-induced stress on the fetus and schizophrenia.

Hunger winter
During World War II, a Nazi barricade resulted in a severe famine in the Western Netherlands.  Where food was previously plentiful, supplies immediately were cut off in November 1944, resulting in a period of starvation that lasted until spring of 1945.  The Dutch people survived on as little as 30% of their daily needed caloric intake, and tens of thousands of people died. Analyses of the orderly health records from this time period allow for a systematic comparison of the effects of fetal starvation. Individuals who were in utero during the Hunger Winter were subject to different outcomes depending on the period of time in which they were conceived.  Those who were in the first trimester during the three-month siege were likely to be born normal size, having caught up with typical development.  However, these normal size babies developed high blood pressure, diabetes, and obesity.  Contrary to this group, those who were in the third trimester during the siege, who presumably had been well nourished up until the last few months of gestation, were born small.  But, these small babies stayed small their entire lives, and did not develop higher rates of obesity or disease. Surprisingly, effects continued to be seen in the offspring of the individuals who were fetuses at the time of the famine.

Ramadan fasting 
During Ramadan (of the lunar cycle) many Muslims around the world participate in a fast during the daylight hours of the lunar month. This fasting usually entails abstaining from food or drink for the daylight hours of the month.   There are groups that are automatically exempt from having to participate such as the young, sick and old but the list of exemption does not officially include pregnant women (though they are most often allowed exemption). The majority of pregnant women however, choose to participate despite the hardship due to cultural and personal pressure. In several recent studies on the effects of fasting during Ramadan and Fetal Origins Hypothesis they have found many negative outcomes on children who were in utero during the fast. These outcomes were as numerous as a change in birth weight to the long term health of the affected. The studies were conducted primarily in Uganda and Iraq but had some smaller sections in Michigan and other places for control groups or specific studies. The effects on birth weight are negatively correlated with Ramadan fasting. Arab Muslim pregnancies that overlap with the Ramadan fast experienced a lower birth weight of 18 grams per child. The effect was slightly larger at a lower birth weight of 20-25 grams if Ramadan fell somewhere in the first or second trimester of the pregnancy. In utero exposure to Ramadan fasting has a negative effect on male birth rate causing a skewed sex ratio for total births. When exposure to the Ramadan fast takes place a month after conception it is correlated with a 13% decline in total births. The effects on exposed males and females is drastically different where the male birth rate drops by 26% the female birth rate only drops by 2.5% leading to the assumption that “male vulnerability” may be to blame. In a study conducted in Uganda and Iraq on the levels of disability among those exposed to the fast while in utero they concluded that disability rates were much higher for those exposed when controlling for outside factors. Though the measure for disability differs by country the effect is still noticeable. For those born 9 months after Ramadan the likelihood of disability is higher than the surrounding population. The mean rate of disability in Uganda is 3.8% for the country but for those exposed the number is drastically higher at 22% mean disability rate. A similar effect can be observed in Iraq where the mean rate of disability is 1.5% but the disability rate of those exposed is 23%. In Uganda the recorded number of blind and deaf can be specifically recorded allowing one to see the effect on this specific disability to expose. Those born 9 months after Ramadan were 33% more likely to be blind and 64% more likely to be deaf than those not exposed in utero. The effects of exposure to the Ramadan fast can even be observed in mental disorders. In a study conducted in Uganda it was concluded that exposure to the fast, early in a pregnancy effectively doubles the likelihood of a person having a cognitive disorder of some kind. A similar discovery was made in Iraq where 63% higher likelihood of a cognitive disorder relative to the mean was discovered for all those exposed. Certain specific health effects have been observed for those exposed to in utero fasting. The reported signs of Anemia among the old were higher for those exposed during mid gestation, all other points in the gestation period were found to be insignificant. Anemia is caused by damage to the kidneys so the findings are consistent that the effect is noticeable during mid gestation when the kidneys are being developed.

Holocaust survivors
The offspring of Holocaust survivors have been found to have an epigenetic 'tag' change in their DNA similar to those of their parents, individuals affected directly by the Holocaust.  This finding shows that gene expressions can be altered via stressful experiences and then passed down to children through prenatal conditions.  While the children of the Holocaust survivors had not themselves experienced Nazi inflicted trauma, they experienced the physiological and emotional trauma as if they had.  When compared to Jewish families who were living outside of affected areas of Europe, the findings continued to stand: "The gene changes in the children could only be attributed to Holocaust exposure in the parents.”

Pollution
Pollution may affect the health of the mother, or cross over the placenta and enter the developing fetus.  Beate Ritz, a professor at UCLA, found significantly higher rates of heart malformations and valve defects in the children born to women living in highly polluted areas of Los Angeles.

Maternal stress
Maternal stress has been linked to a number of negative outcomes for the developing fetus.  Pregnant women who firsthand experienced the devastation of the World Trade Center attack on September 11, 2001 were studied to observe the effects of PTSD (post-traumatic stress disorder) on their child's future health.  Of the women studied, those who developed PTSD following the attacks had lower basal cortisol levels than a control group. Their children, also, had lower basal cortisol levels than those not exposed to extreme prenatal stressors. The finding was strongest for the women who were in their third trimester during 9/11.  Based on the findings that there was a trimester distinction in strength, conclusions can be drawn that the development of a vulnerability to stress was due at least in part to environment in utero. 9/11 is also correlated with lower birth weights of children born to women with Arabic sounding names following the attacks; this could possibly be due to fear of retaliation or stereotyping associations with the attackers.  Stress has also been linked to preterm birth, as shown by research studies conducted following the Tarapaca, Chile earthquake in 2005, as well as the Northridge, California earthquake in 1994.  Similar findings have been replicated for stressful life experiences and fetal outcomes in the Hurricane Katrina population of 2005.  Women in New Orleans at the time who reported enduring multiple severe disaster experiences also had a significantly higher chance of delivering early or low birth weight children. Experiencing loss during pregnancy also influences postnatal outcomes.  Women who experienced the death of a close family member, friend, or spouse, or were pregnant during a wartime conflict, were more likely to have children prematurely, and the children of these women were significantly more likely than the general population to suffer from schizophrenia in adulthood. Besides birth weight, mental health, and reduced cortisol levels, effects of stress during pregnancy have also been linked to impaired cognitive development in children as seen in the maternal population exposed to a severe snowstorm in Canada.  Women who experienced the most stressful storm related events had children with detriments in cognitive, language, behavioral, and attention outcomes. Shockingly, the poorer performance by these children has persisted until the age of ten. Even job-related stress has been found to be associated with low birth weight and preterm birth.  Working long hours, having temporarily employment, or reporting physically demanding job tasks showed "significant and strong" associations with poorer later birth outcomes.  Findings for the job stress-birth association have been replicated by obstetricians at Cedars-Sinai Medical Center in Los Angeles.  However, some research has found that moderate amounts of stress and cortisol passed on to a developing fetus are actually beneficial, perhaps acting to give organs a "workout" prior to birth. Further cementing the theory that maternal emotional state can impact child development are the sound research findings that women who are clinically or slightly depressed during pregnancy are more likely to have children with low birth weight, putting them at risk for future health concerns of their own. On May 12, 2008, a raid took place in Postville, Iowa, where 389 workers at a meat processing factory were arrested and held for questioning. Out of the 389 workers detained, 270 served sentences and most were deported to primarily Mexico and Guatemala. Among those arrested 98% were Latino as they were suspected of being illegal immigrants. Latino families feared future deportations and future raids creating psychological stress on Latinos in the area. In relation to maternal stress a study was conducted which found that Latino babies born 37 weeks after the event experienced a 24% greater risk of lower birth (about 5.5 pounds) weight than babies born in other years. The risk for preterm births was also higher for Latina women when compared to non-Latina White women.

Criticism of theory
Criticism of the fetal origins hypothesis can be aimed at the limitations of the research.  Confounds abound due to the intertwined nature of environment before and after birth, as well as the correlational factors associated with poverty outcomes. Additionally, the use of historical and longitudinal data raises the question of reliability.  Also, some critics maintain that despite the compelling relationship documented between low birth weight and later disease, it is too soon to begin to mandate interventions aimed at increasing birth weight.  Such interventions could instead have increased negative effects, until the specific mechanisms and processes are more deeply understood by which birth and early childhood weight determine development.  As stated in "Killing Me Softly: The Fetal Origins Hypothesis", "Such pre-emptive targeting would constitute a radical departure from current policies that steer nearly all healthcare resources to the sick, i.e. the “pound of cure” approach. That said, the existing evidence is not sufficient to allow us to rank the cost-effectiveness of interventions targeted at women against more traditional interventions targeted at children, adolescents, or adults. For example, broadening the target population to women who might get pregnant would reduce the set of policies which are cost effective."

Implications for intervention
The implications of the developmental origins of health and disease hypothesis are akin to changing the focus of public health intervention from childhood to in utero.  Because the demonstrated effects range from dramatic to subtle in the wide spread areas of educational achievement, emotional stability, career trajectory, life expectancy, disease prognosis, and psychological disorders, interventions addressing the gestational period could potentially have significant impact on individual and societal levels. Proposed and in effect interventions include the following: 
 Address poverty and nutritional needs of pregnant women
 Pre-natal iodine supplements
 The federal food stamp program
 The Supplemental Feeding Program for Women, Infants, and Children (WIC)

See also
Epigenetics
Epidemiology
Evolutionary developmental psychology
Fetal psychology
Prenatal nutrition and birth weight
Thrifty gene hypothesis
Thrifty phenotype
Fetal programming

References

Epidemiology
Epigenetics
Maternal health
Child development
Developmental psychology
Human pregnancy